Hockey Club Monza was a Roller Hockey team from Monza, Italy. It was founded in 1933 and closed in 2004.

Honours

National
Serie A1 italian championship: 7
 1951, 1953, 1956, 1961, 1965, 1966, 1968
Coppa Italia: 2
 1971, 1984, 1989

InternationalCERS Cup: 1
1988–89

Roller hockey clubs in Italy
Sports clubs established in 1933
1933 establishments in Italy
2004 disestablishments in Italy
Sports clubs disestablished in 2004